Ayesha Takia Azmi (née Takia; born 10 April 1986), is an Indian actress and former model who worked predominantly in Hindi films. Takia made her debut in 2004 with the action thriller Taarzan: The Wonder Car for which she won the Filmfare Best Debut Award and IIFA Award Star Debut of the Year Female. She then subsequently appeared in several successful films including Socha Na Tha (2005), Salaam-E-Ishq (2007), Wanted (2009), and Paathshaala (2010). She is the recipient of the Bengal Film Journalists' Association awards and Screen Awards.

Takia was first recognized as a model when she performed in Falguni Pathak's music video Meri Chunar Udd Udd Jaye at the age of fourteen in 2000. Since then, she had appeared in music videos, television commercials, fashion shows, and on magazine covers. Takia made her debut in South Indian cinema in the Telugu-language action heist Super (2005), for which she won the Screen Award for Best Actress (Critics). She subsequently appeared in financially unsuccessful films including Shaadi Se Pehle (2006), Cash (2007), De Taali (2008) and 8 x 10 Tasveer (2009). The 2006 drama Dor, marked a turning point in her career winning her several awards nomination including Screen Award for Best Actress (Critics), Zee Cine Award – Critics' Choice Best Actress, Bengal Film Journalists' Association - Best Actress Award and Stardust Best Supporting Actress Award.

In addition to acting, Takia supports wildlife protection, and has been featured as a talent judge on the musical-reality show Sur Kshetra. She is married to Farhan Azmi, with whom she has a son born in 2013.

Early life and background
Takia was born in Bombay on 10 April 1986, to Nishit Takia, a Gujarati Hindu, and Faridah Takia, a Maharashtrian and half- Caucasian British. She has a younger sister Natasha. She studied at St Anthony's Girls High School, Chembur.

Career

Modelling career and debut (2000-2005)

Before starting her career as an actor, Takia appeared in several commercials. She started her career as a model when she was thirteen, appearing in the I am a Complan Boy! I'm a Complan Girl! campaign along with Shahid Kapoor. Her first public appearance was in the music video for Falguni Pathak's song Meri Chunar Udd Udd Jaye. Later, she appeared in the music video Shake It Daddy, a remix of song Nahin Nahin Abhi Nahin along with actor Keith Sequeira. Both the songs were directed by Vinay Sapru and Radhika Rao, which brought her to the attention of Bollywood, and a few films offer followed.

In 2004, Takia played her first leading role as Priya Kapoor in Abbas–Mustan's supernatural action thriller film Taarzan: The Wonder Car alongside debutante Vatsal Sheth. Loosely based on comedy drama Christine (1983), the film turned out to be financially unsuccessful. However, she has been praised for her glamorous appearance in the film. Takia's portrayal earned her Filmfare Best Female Debut Award (2005) and IIFA Award for Star Debut of the Year – Female (2005). Takia next starred alongside Shahid Kapoor in the multi-starrer romantic comedy Dil Maange More!!! (2004). Takia's role as a dominant, combative girl named Shagun earned her two nominations viz. Screen Award for Most Promising Newcomer – Female and Zee Cine Award for Best Female Debut. The film became unsuccessful at the box office, however proving to be a breakthrough as it boosted the careers of Takia and Kapoor.

In 2004, Takia starred in three films. Her first release of the year was writer-director Imtiaz Ali's romantic comedy Socha Na Tha. Besides being Imtiaz Ali's first film as a director, Socha Na Tha also marked Abhay Deol's acting debut. Upon release it received positive reviews from critics: Patcy N for Rediff.com wrote, "Ayesha Takia is a sweet, energetic actress, but her role does not require too much acting skill". However, the movie was an average grosser at the box-office and earned around  worldwide. Takia next co-starred David Dhawan's multi-starrer comedy Shaadi No. 1, opposite Fardeen Khan. The film which illustrates the story of three couples featured an ensemble cast (Sanjay Dutt, Fardeen Khan, Zayed Khan, Sharman Joshi, Esha Deol, and Soha Ali Khan). The film received a positive response from critics, and also did well at the box office. She then appeared in Sujoy Ghosh's comedy-drama Home Delivery, which was also her last release of 2004. The film received negative reviews, with criticism aimed at the unoriginal plot and humor, and underperformed at the box office. Nonetheless, Takia was praised for her role. The Hindu wrote, "In the film, role played by Ayesha Takia, is the other attraction of the storyline".

In 2005, Takia made her debut in South Indian cinema in the Telugu-language action heist Super alongside Nagarjuna Akkineni. The film was a financial success but received mixed responses by the critics. B. Anuradha for Rediff.com wrote, "Ayesha debuts in Telugu films with a glamorous role". Indiaglitz wrote, "Ayesha is cool and chic. Her angles and curves provide all the glamour and keep you engrossed". Her performance as a doctor named Siri Valli earned her first Filmfare Award for Best Actress – Telugu nomination at 53rd Filmfare Awards South. The film was also later dubbed and released in Hindi as Robbery.

Successes, setback and sabbatical (2006-2012)
In 2006, Takia appeared in Satish Kaushik's comedy Shaadi Se Pehle. Loosely influenced by an old Hindi movie, Meri Biwi Ki Shaadi, it opened to predominantly negative reviews. Released on 6 April 2006, the film eventually under-performed at the box office grossing  worldwide. Rajeev Masand described her performance as, "Ayesha Takia has precious little to do, and that's a pity because she's such a spontaneous actress". She next played the protagonist in Naseeruddin Shah-directed drama Yun Hota Toh Kya Hota (2006), co-starring alongside an ensemble cast Konkona Sen Sharma, Irrfan Khan, Jimmy Sheirgill, Paresh Rawal, and Boman Irani. Set in the United States, the film follows the story of a group of individuals who eventually become interwind with 9/11. Yun Hota Toh Kya Hota earned little at the box office and received mixed reviews. Later in the same year, Takia played the part of a Rajasthani Hindu woman in Nagesh Kukunoor's smaller-budget drama Dor. The film also features Gul Panag and Shreyas Talpade as the lead actors. An official adaptation of the Malayalam film, Perumazhakkalam (2004), the film tells a story of a widow. It did perform well commercially. The Times of India cited, "Apart from the unusual plot, it is Ayesha Takia who simply blows your breath away". Takia's performance as a young widowed Rajasthani woman living in a traditional joint family went on to win several awards for her performance in the film, including the Zee Cine Critics Award for Best Actress.

In 2007, Takia appeared in seven films, the first being Nikkhil Advani's romantic drama Salaam-e-Ishq, featuring an ensemble cast of Salman Khan, Priyanka Chopra, Anil Kapoor, Juhi Chawla, Akshaye Khanna, John Abraham, Vidya Balan, Govinda, Shannon Esra, Sohail Khan and Isha Koppikar in lead roles. The film (and her performance) generated mixed reviews from critics, and its eventual box-office profit was poor. Takia's next film role was alongside Tusshar Kapoor in Kya Love Story Hai. The critical reaction to the film and Takia's portrayal of a young girl was negative. Co-starring alongside Shahid Kapoor, Ahmed Khan's multi-starer comedy caper film Fool & Final was her next release. The film with an ensemble cast met with mixed critical reviews. Taran Adarsh from Bollywood Hungama commented, "'Ayesha Takia pairs off well with Shahid, but doesn't have much to do really". In the same year, Takia appeared in the action thriller film Cash. Directed by Anubhav Sinha, the movie generated mostly negative reviews and emerged as a commercial failure.

Takia played the female lead role in Vishal Bhardwaj's short film Blood Brothers. With a run time of 13 minutes, the film depicted the story of a young man who, after finding out that he is HIV positive, allows his life to fall apart. It premiered at the Toronto International Film Festival. Her final release of the year 2007 was the psychological thriller No Smoking, opposite John Abraham. Based upon the 1978 short story "Quitters, Inc." by Stephen King, it was directed by Anurag Kashyap. The film tells a story of a narcissistic and self-obsessed chain-smoker who gets trapped in the rehabilitation programme of a person who guarantees will make him quit smoking. Takia played the twin role of the main protagonist's wife and secretary, Anjali and Annie respectively. Released on 26 October 2007, the film heavily received negative reviews from Indian critics. Shubhra Gupta for Indian Express commented, "No Smoking is no good. Not because it doesn't have a superb idea. It does. But because it is too bizarre, too outré, too out of it. It stops us from connecting". The film failed to perform well at the box office and eventually becoming one of the major disasters of the year. No Smoking, however, received three nominations viz. Filmfare Award for Best Art Direction, Filmfare Award for Best Cinematographer, and Filmfare Award for Best Special Effects at the 53rd Filmfare Awards.

In 2008, Takia co-starred in Rohit Shetty's directed mystery comedy Sunday. Critical response to the film was mixed and the film was an average performer at the box office. Takia garnered acclaim for her performance as a voiceover artist named Sehar. She then starred in comedy De Taali. The film did not perform well at the box office and earned poor critical reviews.

Takia had two major releases in 2009:  action thriller 8 x 10 Tasveer opposite Akshay Kumar and Prabhu Deva's Wanted co-starring Salman Khan. 8 x 10 Tasveer received a mixed reception and performed poorly at the box office. The film stars Takia as Sheila, the fiancé of Akshaye's character. Critical response towards Takia's performance received moderate reviews: Rajeev Masand stated, "Ayesha plays the role of Jai's (Akshay) fiancé and it doesn’t leave much of an impression". Taran Adarsh for Bollywood Hungama wrote, "Ayesha's role is natural and graceful". The Times of India noted, "There's nothing really to cheer you up in the desultory proceedings, unless you want to watch Ayesha". Wanted was given mixed reviews by most critics and became one of the highest-grossing films of the year, as well as Takia's biggest commercial success to date. Takia's role as Jahnvi, met with positive reviews. Rediff commented, "Ayesha Takia is given a truly raw deal. She's given a role that can only be described as insufficient".

In 2010, Takia starred in the drama Paathshaala, alongside Shahid Kapoor. The movie generated mixed reviews and emerged as a commercial success. Her performance as a nutritionist Anjali Mathur was praised by the critics. Her last release of the year was Mod, which met with a good response. In 2012, she hosted the only season of the musical-reality show Sur Kshetra.

Personal life

At the age of 23, Takia married her boyfriend Farhan Azmi; a restaurateur, and son of Samajwadi Party leader Abu Azmi, on 1 March 2009, with whom she has a son. Takia is very active on social media, especially Twitter and has been a supporter of wildlife protection. She declared her last name as Takia Azmi on social media and have converted into Islam after marriage.

In April 2014, Ayesha denounced her father-in-law, the Samajwadi Party legislator Abu Azmi, for saying that rape victims should also be punished. In a public statement, she stated she is a vegan while posing for a vegan ad for PETA India.

Filmography

Films

Television

Awards and nominations

See also

 Filmfare Award for Best Female Debut
 List of Indian film actresses
List of Hindi film actresses

References

External links

 
 

1986 births
21st-century Indian actresses
Actresses from Mumbai
Actresses in Hindi cinema
Actresses in Telugu cinema
Female models from Mumbai
Gujarati people
Indian film actresses
Living people
Filmfare Awards winners
Screen Awards winners
International Indian Film Academy Awards winners
Zee Cine Awards winners